"Lilla fågel blå" is a song written and recorded by Staffan Hellstrand for his 1993 album Regn.

Hellström said the song was created when he tried to develop the musical ideas from the song "Hela himlen svart" from his previous album, Eld. Song lyrics are about a youth friend of him who suffered from schizophrenia, but the opening words "Det kallas himlen ..." ("It's called heaven")... has led to people believing the song is dedicated to a deceased person.

For the song, Hellstrand was given a Grammis award for "Song of the year 1993" and the song also won a Rockbjörnen award in the "Swedish song of the year 1993" category.

The single peaked at eight position at the Swedish singles chart. At Dansbandskampen 2009, the song was performed by the Highlights.

Charts

References

External links 
Information at Svensk mediedatabas

1993 songs
1993 singles
Songs written by Staffan Hellstrand
EMI Records singles
Swedish-language songs